was a Japanese waka poet of the mid-Heian period. One of his poems was included in the Ogura Hyakunin Isshu. He produced a private collection, the Egyō-hōshi-shū, and was listed as one of the Late Classical Thirty-Six Immortals of Poetry.

Biography 
Although his exact birth and death dates are unknown, he flourished in the Kanna era in the mid-980s, His name is sometimes read as Ekei.

Poetry 
Fifty-six of his poems were included in imperial anthologies from the Shūi Wakashū on, and he was included in the Late Classical Thirty-Six Immortals of Poetry.

The following poem by him was included as No. 47 in Fujiwara no Teika's Ogura Hyakunin Isshu:

Religion 
He is supposed to have delivered sermons on the Buddhist sutras at the Kokubun-ji in Harima Province.

References

Bibliography 
 
McMillan, Peter. 2010 (1st ed. 2008). One Hundred Poets, One Poem Each. New York: Columbia University Press.
Suzuki Hideo, Yamaguchi Shin'ichi, Yoda Yasushi. 2009 (1st ed. 1997). Genshoku: Ogura Hyakunin Isshu. Tokyo: Bun'eidō.

External links 
List of Egyō's poems in the International Research Center for Japanese Studies's online waka database.
Egyō-hōshi-shū in the same database.
Egyō on Kotobank.

10th-century Japanese poets
People of Heian-period Japan
Japanese Buddhist clergy
Japanese male poets
Articles containing Japanese poems
Hyakunin Isshu poets
Heian period Buddhist clergy